Arjun Ivatury (born February 17, 1991), known professionally as 6ix, is an American record producer mostly known for his work in Gaithersburg, Maryland with rapper Logic as his in-house producer. Other artists he has worked with include Dizzy Wright, Michael Christmas, Sylvan LaCue, and Jessica Andrea. He is associated with the independent record label Visionary Music Group. He is best known for his innovative and avant-garde hip hop beats which are considered one of the reasons for the success of Logic's early works like Bobby Tarantino and Under Pressure.

Early life and career 

Ivatury is a native of Bowie, Maryland, being the son of Telugu-speaking Hindu immigrant parents originally from India. He comes from a white-collar Indian American background; his father and mother being a doctor and engineer respectively as well as his brother being an aerospace engineer at NASA. Before he became a full-time producer, 6ix attended the University of Maryland, College Park, where he majored in neurology and physiology.  In his senior year he dropped out of college in 2009 to move to Los Angeles with Bobby Hall, known professionally as Logic, to pursue a career in music production; he was 30 credits shy of his degree.

6ix is best known for his work with Logic for whom he has produced over 53 songs since late 2009 to the present day, including eleven from Logic's 2018 album YSIV and ten from  No Pressure (2020). The first song Logic and 6ix produced together was "Love Jones" from Logic's first mixtape. He was nominated for a Grammy Award for the first time for producing the song "1-800-273-8255" by Logic featuring Alessia Cara and Khalid.

On 15 February 2019, he also performed on stage alongside Logic and Eminem during his concert at Aloha Stadium, Hawaii.

Latest projects
6ix is also the executive producer of Logic's albums YSIV, released on September 28, 2018, Confessions of a Dangerous Mind released on May 10, 2019, and Vinyl Days, released on June 17, 2022. Confessions of a Dangerous Mind, although having mixed reception, has been widely praised, by critics and fans alike, for its production, mixing and sound engineering.

6ix also was on the production of ten of fifteen tracks on Logic's 6th album No Pressure, which was released on July 24, 2020.

References 

1991 births
Living people
Record producers from Los Angeles
University of Maryland, College Park alumni